Rashmirathi (Rashmi: Ray of light Rathi: One who rides a chariot (not the charioteer) Rashmirathi: Rider of the chariot of light) is a Hindi epic written in 1952, by the Hindi poet Ramdhari Singh 'Dinkar'. The epic poem narrates the story of Karna who is regarded as one of main protagonist of the Hindu epic- Mahabharata.  It is the most appreciated work of Dinkar, an Indian poet.

About the poem
Karna was the first-born of Kunti, whom she had abandoned at birth as he was conceived before her marriage. Karna was born due to a boon by the Surya Dev (The Sun God). Karna grew up in family of charioteers, and struggled rising from the low charioteer to become the world conqueror and the hero of Mahabharata. In the Mahabharata War, Karna was obliged to fight from the side of Duryodhana who recognized his merits. Duryodhana made him a king and accepted him as a close friend. Karna fighting from Kaurava's side was a great worry for Pandavas as he was reputed to be unconquerable in war.

On the eve of Mahabharata War, Kunti went to Karna and requested him to defuse the war by leaving Duryodhana and coming over to Pandava's side as he was her first born and it was only appropriate for him to fight from the side of Pandavass. A part of Karna's reply in words of Ramdhari Singh 'Dinkar' is given below. Karna says that even as he foresees a defeat for Kauravas, he must fight from the side of Duryodhana. He says that the war is quite pointless yet it is a destiny that has to be fulfilled.

Adaptations
Hindi film "Gulaal" directed by Anurag Kashyap in 2009, has got a rendition of Dinkar's poem "Ye dekh gagan mujh mein lay hai(Part of "Krishna ki Chetavani")" from Rashmirathi chapter 3, performed by Piyush Mishra.

A musical play adaptation of "Rashmirathi" has been directed by Dr. Shakuntala Shukla and Vyomkesh Shukla. This play gives a glance from the eyes of Kunti. This play is produced by the banner of "Roopvani, Varanasi". It has been performed 47 times till now.

The present Prime Minister of India, Narendra Modi wrote a message appreciating the translation of Rashmirathi into English by the Mauritian cultural activist Leela Gujadhur Sarup by writing, "The story of 'a man blessed by the Gods but rejected by Destiny', Rashmirathi is the magnum opus of the Poet laureate of India, Ramdhari Singh, known to all as Dinkar. Reproducing its original in moving English poetry has been a labor of love for Mrs. Leela Sarup, taking her years to do it justice. This will enable a wider range of non-Hindi readers to savor the heart-wrenching lyrical poetry of Dinkar."

Translations

References

External links
Rashmirathi at Kavita Kosh
Read excerpts from Rashmirathi in Hindi at geeta-kavita.com

Hindi poetry
Epic poems in Hindi
Works based on the Mahabharata
Indian poems
1952 poems